Kirill Gennadiyevich Seleznyov (in Russian: Кирилл Геннадиевич Селезнёв, born April 23, 1974, in Leningrad, Soviet Union) is a Russian businessman.

Since April 15, 2002, he has been the Head of the Department for Marketing and Processing of Gas and Liquid Hydrocarbons of Gazprom.

Since September 27, 2002, he has been a Member of the Management Committee of Gazprom.

Since March 20, 2003, he has been the Director General of Mezhregiongaz LLC, a subsidiary of Gazprom.

Since July 2004 he has been a Member of the Board of Directors of RAO UES.

He is also a Member of the Board of Directors of Gazprom Neft.

References and notes

External links
Official biography
Interview with Kirill Seleznyov, Vedomosti #138 (1178), August 5, 2004 (in Russian, subscription required, full text freely available here).
Pictures of Kirill Seleznyov, Kommersant.

1974 births
Living people
Businesspeople from Saint Petersburg
Gazprom people